This is a list of Spanish women's football transfers in the summer transfer window 2015 by club. Primera División clubs are listed according to the 2014–15 season table.

Primera División

In
 Source: Vavel

 1 On loan
 2 Back from loan

Out
 Source: Vavel

 1 On loan
 2 Back from loan

See also
 2014–15 Primera División (women)

Football transfers summer 2014
Trans
2014
Football